Shimelis is a given name. Notable people with the name include:

Shimelis Abdisa, Ethiopian politician
Shimelis Adugna, Ethiopian politician and diplomat
Shimelis Bekele (born 1990), Ethiopian footballer

Ethiopian given names